Uche is a Nigerian name originating among the Igbo people, which can mean "intention", "will", "mind", or "sense". Variants can include Uchechukwu or Uchenna (which means "God's will" or "God's intention"), Ucheoma (which means "beautiful mind"), and Uchendu (which means "thinking/thought of life"). The name Uche may refer to:

People

Given name
Uche Henry Agbo (born 1995), Nigerian football player
Uche Blessed (born 1995), Nigerian software engineer 
Uche Akubuike (born 1980), Nigerian football player
Uche Azikiwe (born 1947), Nigerian writer and first lady
Uche Chukwumerije (1939–2015), Nigerian politician
Uche Eze (born 1983), Nigerian writer and entrepreneur
Uche Iheruome (born 1987), Nigerian football player
Uche Ikpeazu (born 1995), British football player
Uche Jombo (born 1979), Nigerian actress
Uche Kalu (born 1986), Nigerian football player 
Uche Nduka (born 1963), Nigerian writer
Uche Nwaneri (1984-2022), American football player
Uche Nwofor (born 1991), Nigerian football player
Uche Oduoza (born 1986), British rugby player
Uche Okafor (1967–2011), Nigerian football player
Uche Okechukwu (born 1967), Nigerian football player
Uche Okeke (born 1933), Nigerian artist
Uche Sherif (born 1983), Nigerian football player
Uche Secondus (born 1955), Nigerian politician

Surname
Henry Uche (born 1990), Nigerian footballer
Ikechukwu Uche (born 1984), Nigerian football player
Isaac Uche (born 1981), Nigerian sprinter
Josh Uche (born 1998), American football player
Kalu Uche (born 1982), Nigerian football player
Oguchi Uche (born 1987), Nigerian football player

Nigerian names
Igbo given names